Great Lakes Airlines was a regional airline in Canada. It was formed in 1958 in Sarnia, Ontario by John Blunt and by 1983 became Air Ontario Ltd. In June 1987 Air Ontario Ltd. merged with Austin Airways to form Air Ontario Inc. which in turn subsequently operated Air Canada Connector code sharing passenger flights on behalf of Air Canada with Convair 580 and de Havilland Canada DHC-8 Dash 8 series 100 and 300 turboprops.  Air Ontario also operated Fokker F28 Fellowship jets at one point.

Aircraft in service with Great Lakes during the 1970s, being Convair 440 propliners and Convair 580 turboprops, were older and subject to vibrations during take-off, resulting in passengers nicknaming the company "Great Shakes".  Convair 580 turboprops operated by Air Ontario prompted the nickname "Scare Ontario".

Destinations in 1979 
Great Lakes Airlines was serving the following destinations in Ontario province in Canada with scheduled passenger flights operated with Convair aircraft in 1979:

 London, Ontario
 Ottawa, Ontario
 Peterborough, Ontario
 Sarnia, Ontario
 Toronto, Ontario

See also 
 List of defunct airlines of Canada

References

Defunct airlines of Canada
Airlines established in 1958
1958 establishments in Ontario
Airlines disestablished in 1987
1987 disestablishments in Ontario
Companies based in Ontario
Sarnia
Canadian companies disestablished in 1987
Canadian companies established in 1958